Nellie Winifred Bernice Schroder  (née Radford, 17 January 1903 – 10 June 1993) was a notable New Zealand teacher and community leader. She was born in Plumstead, Kent, England in 1903.

In the 1964 New Year Honours, Schroder was appointed a Member of the Order of the British Empire, for services to the community, especially in connection with the Women's Division of Federated Farmers.

References

1903 births
1993 deaths
British emigrants to New Zealand
People from Plumstead
New Zealand schoolteachers
People educated at Nelson College for Girls
New Zealand Members of the Order of the British Empire